Pseudaspius leptocephalus, the Redfin, is a species of cyprinid fish found in eastern Asia where it occurs in the countries of Russia, Mongolia and China.  It is the only species in its genus.

References
 

Cyprinid fish of Asia
Fish described in 1776
Taxa named by Peter Simon Pallas